Dennis Earl Woodberry (born April 22, 1961) is a former American football cornerback in the National Football League for the Atlanta Falcons and the Washington Redskins and in the United States Football League for the Birmingham Stallions.  Woodberry played college football at Southern Arkansas University.

Early life
Woodberry was born in Texarkana, Arkansas and attended Arkansas High School.

College career
Woodberry attended and played college football at Southern Arkansas University.  He was the first football player from Southern Arkansas to be drafted into the National Football League.

Professional career
Woodberry began his professional football career in the United States Football League for the Birmingham Stallions, where he played in 1984 and 1985.  He was drafted in the 1984 NFL supplemental draft of USFL and CFL players by the Atlanta Falcons.  He joined the Falcons in the offseason of 1986, and was cut on September 1st.  However, due to injuries, he was resigned and played the last seven games for the Falcons.  He was then traded to the Green Bay Packers for cash in 1987, but never played a game for them.  Woodberry was signed in 1987 by the Washington Redskins.  The 1987 season began with a 24-day players' strike, reducing the 16-game season to 15.  The games for weeks 4–6 were won with all replacement players, including Woodberry. The Redskins have the distinction of being the only team with no players crossing the picket line.  Those three victories are often credited with getting the team into the playoffs and the basis for the 2000 movie The Replacements.  He was one of the few replacement players that the Redskins retained after the strike ended.

References

External links
 

1961 births
Living people
People from Texarkana, Arkansas
American football cornerbacks
Atlanta Falcons players
Washington Redskins players
Southern Arkansas Muleriders football players
Birmingham Stallions players
National Football League replacement players
Players of American football from Arkansas